Mr Thomas is the first play by the English actress and playwright Kathy Burke. It was first performed at the Old Red Lion theatre pub in Islington in February 1990. Set in 1950s London had a cast of five, with the action all taking place in a single day in the small attic room bedsit belonging to George on a mid-week day in November 1957.

Cast
 George, played by James Clyde
 Weaver, played by Ray Winstone
 Brenda Tebbit, played by Anita Graham
 Gordon Davis, played by James Snell
 Cyril Thomas, played by Ian Jentle

Set design was by Matthew Duguid and John Pope, music by Simon Brint.

The production was subsequently restaged for broadcast by Channel 4 that Autumn.

1990 plays
Plays set in London
1990s debut plays
Plays by Kathy Burke